Pakistan Textile City is located in Karachi, Sindh, Pakistan. Pakistan Textile City is an industrial zone dedicated to the textile processing and related industry. Established in 2009, with a total area of 1250 acres, the estate is located in the Eastern Industrial Zone of Port Qasim Karachi, 6 km from the National Highway.

The Federal Government of Pakistan has a 40% share in the textile city whereas the Sindh Government has 16% shareholding. National Bank of Pakistan (NBP) has 8% stake, the Export Processing Zone 4%, Saudi Pak Insurance Company 4%, National Investment Bank 4%, Pak Kuwait Investment Company 4%, Pak Qatar Investment Company 4% and PIDC 1%.

Currently, the Pakistan Textile City project is on the verge of collapse, incurring huge loss to the national exchequer as the government is paying about Rs.400 million as interest on bank loans per year. Due to mismanagement and corruption the debt of textile city is exceeding Rs.2.4 billion.

Other Industrial Parks in Karachi
 Bin Qasim Industrial Zone
 Federal B Industrial Area
 Karachi Export Processing Zone
 Korangi Creek Industrial Park
 Korangi Industrial Area
 North Karachi Industrial Area
 S.I.T.E Industrial Area
 West Wharf Industrial Area

References

External links
 

Industrial parks in Karachi
1987 establishments in Pakistan
Korangi Town
Textile industry of Pakistan